Steffi Graf was the defending champion, but lost in the final against Conchita Martínez. The score was 6–3, 6–3.

Seeds

Draw

Finals

Top half

Bottom half

References

External links
 Official results archive (ITF)
 Official results archive (WTA)

Advanta Championships of Philadelphia
1993 WTA Tour